The 2012 Edo State gubernatorial election occurred in Nigeria on July 14, 2012. The ACN nominee Adams Oshiomhole won for a second term, defeating Charles Airhiavbere of the PDP.

Adams Oshiomhole emerged ACN after he was returned as the sole candidate. He picked Pius Odubu as his running mate. Charles Airhiavbere was the PDP candidate.

Electoral system
The Governor of Edo State is elected using the plurality voting system.

Primary election

ACN primary
Adams Oshiomhole won the primary election after he emerged unopposed.

PDP primary
The PDP primary election was held on February 5, 2012. Charles Airhiavbere emerged PDP flag bearer.

Results
A total number of 7 candidates registered with the Independent National Electoral Commission to contest in the election.

The total number of 667,993 voters were accredited while total number of votes cast was 647,698.

By local government area
Here are the results of the election by local government area for the two major parties. 7 political parties participated in the election. Blue represents LGAs won by Adams Oshiomhole. Green represents LGAs won by Charles Airhiavbere.

References 

Edo State gubernatorial election
Edo State gubernatorial election
Edo State gubernatorial election
2012